"Inside Love (So Personal)" is a song written by Kashif, and performed by American R&B singer George Benson.

Track listing
7" Single
 "Inside Love (So Personal)" - 4:08
 "In Search Of A Dream" - 4:58

12" Single
 "Inside Love (So Personal)" long instrumental version - 7:03
 "Inside Love (So Personal)" LP version - 5:13
 "In Search Of A Dream" - 4:58

Chart performance
The song was one of several singles taken from the album In Your Eyes. Released in 1983, in which it entered the UK Singles Chart on 17 December. It reached a peak position of number 57, and remained in the chart for 5 weeks.

In the U.S., the single was released in the spring of the year.  It reached number 43 on the Billboard Hot 100, and number and number 40 on Cash Box.

References

External links
 

George Benson songs
1983 singles
Warner Records singles
1983 songs